This is a list of compositions by Henry Cowell.

Pieces by date of composition 

 Anger Dance (1914; orig. Mad Dance)
 Dynamic Motion (1916; frequently misdated 1914)
 Three Irish Legends (1922)
 The Tides of Manaunaun (1917; frequently misdated 1911 or 1912)
 The Hero Sun (1922)
 The Voice of Lir (1920)
 Five Encores to Dynamic Motion (1917)
 What's This?
 Amiable Conversation 
 Advertisement 
 Antinomy (rev. 1959)
 Time Table
 The Trumpet of Angus Og (1918–24)
 Fabric (1920)
 Vestiges (1920)
 The Sword of Oblivion for string piano (ca. 1920–22)
 Exultation (1921)
 Six Ings (1922)
 Floating
 Frisking
 Fleeting
 Scooting
 Wafting
 Seething
 Piece for Piano with Strings (1923; for solo string piano, despite possibly confusing title)
 Aeolian Harp for string piano (ca. 1923)
 A Rudhyar (1924)
 The Harp of Life (1924)
 The Snows of Fuji-Yama (1924)
 The Banshee for string piano (1925)
 Slow Jig (1925)
 The Leprechaun (1928)
 Two Woofs (1928)
 Euphoria (1929)
 Fairy Answer (1929)
 Two Pieces (1930)
 Lilt of the Reel
 Tiger
 Sinister Resonance for string piano (ca. 1930)
 Deep Color (1938)
 Rhythmicana (1938)
 High Color (ca. late 1930s–early 1940s)
 Elegie (for Hanya Holm) (1941)
 Persian Set (1957)

List of solo piano compositions
Piano compositions by American composers
Lists of piano compositions by composer
Piano compositions in the 20th century
Lists of compositions by composer